Epworth (also Hawthorn Station) is an unincorporated community in White County, Illinois, United States.

Notes

Unincorporated communities in White County, Illinois
Unincorporated communities in Illinois